A list of tunnels in Germany longer than 10 metres.

Baden-Württemberg

Road tunnels 

 Saukopf Tunnel (2.715 m)
 Michael Tunnel (2544 m)
 Engelberg Tunnel (2.530 m)
 Heslach Tunnel (2.300 m, Stuttgart)
 Pragsattel Tunnel (720 m; at Prag in Stuttgart)
 Kappelberg Tunnel
 Schlossberg Tunnel, Tübingen
 Schönbuch Tunnel
 Hölzern Tunnel
 Schwäbisch Gmünd Tunnel (2.200 m)
 Schlossberg Tunnel, Heidelberg (916 m)
 Wagenburg Tunnel (824 m, Stuttgart)
 Wattkopf Tunnel (1950 m near Ettlingen)
 Meistern Tunnel (1684 m, Bad Wildbad)

Speed limit 
With few exceptions, Baden-Württemberg has a speed limit of 100 km/h for all road and motorway tunnels that have two tubes. It is the only German state where this is the case; other German states have had a speed limit of 80 km/h. Bavaria has been raising the speed limit in such tunnels from 80 km/h to 100 km/h since 2007, and North Rhine-Westphalia has been doing the same since 2008.

Railway tunnels 

 Karlsruhe–Mühlacker railway: Pforzheim Tunnel.
 Ammer Valley Railway: • Schlossberg Tunnel, Tübingen
 Stuttgart–Horb railway: • Kriegsberg Tunnel (579 m) • Hasenberg Tunnel (258 m) 
 Plochingen–Immendingen railway: • Tierstein Tunnel (656 m)  • Sulzau Tunnel (493 m)
 New and improved Karlsruhe–Basel railway line: • Katzenberg Tunnel (9,385 m,) • Rastatt Tunnel (4,270 m, under construction)
 Mannheim–Stuttgart high speed railway: • Altenberg Tunnel (220 m) • Burgberg Tunnel (1.115 m) • Forst Tunnel (1,727 m) • Freudenstein Tunnel (6,800 m) • Langes Feld Tunnel (4,632 m) • Markstein Tunnel (2,782 m) • Neuenberg Tunnel (762 m) • Pfingstberg Tunnel (5,380 m) • Pulverding Tunnel (1,878 m) • Rollenberg Tunnel (3,303 m) • Saubuckel Tunnel (403 m) • Simonsweingarten Tunnel (420 m) • Wilfenberg Tunnel (1,006 m)
 Badische Schwarzwald Railway: • Eisenberg Tunnel (792 m) • Farrenhalde Tunnel (313 m) • Forellen Tunnel (64 m) • Gaisloch Tunnel (54 m) • Glasträg Tunnel I (23 m) • Glasträg Tunnel II (43 m) • Glasträg Tunnel III (18 m) • Gremmelsbach Tunnel (912 m) • Großer Triberg Tunnel (835 m) • Großhalde Tunnel (327 m) • Grundwald Tunnel (381 m) • Gummambs Tunnel (365 m) • Hippensbach Tunnel (365 m) • Hohenack Tunnel (41 m) • Hohnen Tunnel (327 m) • Kleiner Triberg Tunnel (92 m) • Krähenloch Tunnel (224 m) • Kurzenberg Tunnel (324 m) • Letschenberg Tunnel (129 m) • Losbach Tunnel (185 m) • Möhring Tunnel (180 m) • Mühlhalde Tunnel (64 m) • Niederwass Tunnel (558 m) • Obergieß Tunnel (175 m) • Rebberg Tunnel (53 m) • Röllerwald Tunnel (162 m) • Schieferhalde Tunnel (93 m) • Seelenwald Tunnel I (48 m) • Seelenwald Tunnel II (69 m) • Seelenwald Tunnel III (195 m) • Sommerau Tunnel (1,697 m) • Sommerberg Tunnel (51 m) • Spärle Tunnel (80 m) • Steinbis Tunnel (63 m) • Tannenbühl Tunnel (25 m) • Tannenwald Tunnel (166 m) • Tunnel beim 3. Bauer (88 m) • Tunnel beim 4. Bauer (313 m) • Hatting Tunnel (900 m; also Gäu Railway)
 Stuttgart: • Filder Tunnel (9,468 m, planned as part of the Stuttgart–Wendlingen high-speed railway) • Prag Tunnel (on Franconia Railway) • Rosenstein Tunnel (on Fils Valley Railway) • Tunnel on the Stuttgart Link Line (part of the Stuttgart S-Bahn) (8,788 m, longest S-Bahn tunnel in Germany)
 Neckar Valley Railway: • Königstuhl Tunnel (2,486 m)

Bavaria

Road tunnels 
 Allach Tunnel
 Aubing Tunnel
 Farchant Tunnel
 Füssen Border Tunnel
 Hofberg Tunnel
 Tunnels in Munich:
 Altstadtring Tunnel
 Biederstein Tunnel
 Brudermühl Tunnel
 Candid Tunnel
 Effner Tunnel
 Innsbrucker Ring Tunnel
 Landshuter Allee Tunnel
 Leuchtenbergring Tunnel
 Petuel Tunnel
 Richard Strauss Tunnel
 Trappentreu Tunnel
 Neubiberg Tunnel
 Pfaffenstein Tunnel
 Schwarzer Berg Tunnel
 Wendelberg Tunnel

Speed limit 
In 2007, Bavaria became the second German state, after Baden-Württemberg, to start increasing the speed limit for road and motorway tunnels with two tubes from 80 to 100 km/h.  The first tunnel to have its speed limit increased from 80 to 100 km/h was the overhead noise barrier tunnel on the A3 auto Railway at Aschaffenburg. The Allach tunnel will be next, following the next scheduled maintenance. The AubingTunnel on the Munich motorway ring is already designed for speeds of 100 km/h and is scheduled to be re-classified.

Railway tunnels 

 Hanover–Würzburg high speed railway (Bavarian section): Dittenbrunn Tunnel, Burgsinn Tunnel, Sinnberg Tunnel, Einmalberg Tunnel, Mühlberg Tunnel, Hanfgarten Tunnel, Hohe Wart Tunnel, Espenloh Tunnel, Eichelberg Tunnel, Neuberg Tunnel, Roßberg Tunnel, Steinberg Tunnel
 Nantenbach Curve: Schönrain Tunnel, Herrbach Tunnel, Ständelberg Tunnel, Rammersberg Tunnel
 Nuremberg–Ingolstadt railway: Göggelsbuch Tunnel, Offenbau Tunnel, Euerwang Tunnel, Schellenberg Tunnel, Irlahüll Tunnel, Denkendorf Tunnel, Stammham Tunnel, Geisberg Tunnel, Audi Tunnel
 More tunnels (selection): Altengronau Forst Tunnel, Burgberg Tunnel (near Erlangen), Felstor Tunnel (Regensburg–Nuremberg line, at 16 metres this used to be the shortest tunnel in Germany), Schwarzkopf Tunnel (Aschaffenburg–Würzburg line)
 Munich S-Bahn trunk line

Underground railway systems 
 Munich U-Bahn
 Nuremberg U-Bahn

Berlin

Road tunnels 

 Tiergarten Tunnel

Railway tunnels 

 Nord-Süd Tunnel
 Berlin North–South mainline: Tiergarten Tunnel

Underground railway systems 
 Berlin U-Bahn

Hamburg

Road tunnels 

 New Elbe tunnel
 Kronstieg Tunnel
 Old Elbe tunnel
 Wallring Tunnel
 Sengelmannstraße Tunnel
 Tunnel A1 at Moorfleet
 Deichtor Tunnel
 Bus tunnel in Veddel
 Binsbarg Tunnel
 Alsterkrugchaussee Tunnel
 Einhausung Holtkoppel
 CCH Tunnel
 Unterführung A23, Dreieck NW
 Unterführung A23, Eidelstedt

Railway tunnels 

 Schellfisch Tunnel
 Hamburg Airport S-Bahn tunnel
  Hamburg City S-Bahn tunnel
 Central Station S-Bahn tunnel
 Harburg S-Bahn tunnel

Underground railway systems 
 Hamburg U-Bahn

Hesse

Road tunnels 

 Saukopf Tunnel (2.715 m)
 Hopfenberg Tunnel
 Walberg Tunnel
 Lohberg Tunnel (1080 m)
 Schiede Tunnel in Limburg
 Schlossberg Tunnel in Dillenburg
 Mühlberg Tunnel in Weilburg
 Overhead noise barrier tunnel in Dalheim
 Theatre Tunnel
 Schürzeberg road tunnel (where the B27 crosses the Schürzeberg railway tunnel)

Railway tunnels 
 On the Cologne–Frankfurt high speed railway (section in Hesse, north–south): Elzer Berg Tunnel (state border, northern entrance in Rhineland-Palatinate), Limburg Tunnel, Idstein Tunnel, Niedernhausen Tunnel, Hellenberg Tunnel, Schulwald Tunnel, Breckenheim Tunnel, Kelsterbacher Spange Tunnel, Frankfurter-Kreuz Tunnel
 On the Hanover–Würzburg high speed railway (section in Hesse): Lohberg Tunnel, Rengershausen Tunnel, Dörnhagen Tunnel, Kehrenberg Tunnel, Erbelberg Tunnel, Hainbuch Tunnel, Kaiserau Tunnel, Weltkugel Tunnel, Wildsberg Tunnel, Sengeberg Tunnel, Schalkenberg Tunnel, Hainrode Tunnel, Mühlbach Tunnel, Schmitteberg Tunnel, Kalter-Sand Tunnel, Schickeberg Tunnel, Krämerskuppe Tunnel, Kirchheim Tunnel, Hattenberg Tunnel, Warteküppel Tunnel, Richthof Tunnel, Dornbusch Tunnel, Witzelhöhe Tunnel, Eichberg Tunnel, Dietershan Tunnel, Sulzhof Tunnel, Hartberg Tunnel, Kalbach Tunnel, Bornheck Tunnel, Landrücken Tunnel, Schwarzenfels Tunnel
 railway Bebra–Göttingen: • Bebenroth Tunnel (930 m) • Cornberg Tunnel (719 m) • Schürzeberg Tunnel (173 m)
 Frankfurt City Tunnel, (5500/6000 m)
 Offenbach City Tunnel, (3700 m)
 Frau-Nauses Tunnel (1205 m, Odenwald Railway)
 Hasselborn Tunnel (1300 m, Solmsbach Valley Railway)
 Krähberg Tunnel (3100 m, longest single-track railway tunnel in Germany, Odenwald Railway)
 Schlüchtern Tunnel (3575 m, Kinzig Valley Railway)

Underground railway systems 
 Frankfurt U-Bahn

Ship tunnels 

 Weilburg Ship tunnel

Mecklenburg-Vorpommern

Road tunnels 

 Warnow Tunnel

Lower Saxony

Road tunnels 

 Butterberg Tunnel
 Ems Tunnel
 Heidkopf Tunnel
 Wes Tunnel

Railway tunnels 

 Tunnels of the Hanover–Würzburg high speed railway in Lower Saxony: Escherberg Tunnel, Eichenberg Tunnel, Eggeberg Tunnel, Riesberg Tunnel, Helleberg Tunnel, Wadenberg Tunnel, Hopfenberg Tunnel, Sohlberg Tunnel, Krieberg Tunnel, Leinebusch Tunnel, Endelskamp Tunnel, Mackenrodt Tunnel, Rauheberg Tunnel, Münden Tunnel, Mühlenkopf Tunnel.
 Naens Tunnel, Ippens Tunnel (both Altenbeken–Kreiensen railway)
 Ertinghäus Tunnel, Wahmbeck Tunnel (both Solling Railway)
 Walkenried Tunnel (South Harz line)

North Rhine-Westphalia

Road tunnels 

 Burgholz Tunnel
 Düsseldorf Airport tunnel
 Kiesberg Tunnel
 Kruin Tunnel (90 m) road and rail tunnel
 Bad Godesberg Tunnel
 Rhineallee Tunnel
 Rhineuf Tunnel (Düsseldorf)
 Rhineuf Tunnel (Cologne)
 Ruhrschnellweg Tunnel
 Berghofen Tunnel
 Wersten Tunnel
 University tunnel
 Weserauen Tunnel
 Hüttentalstraße tunnels in Siegen, including Ziegenberg Tunnel, Bühl Tunnel

Railway tunnels 

 Busch Tunnel (691 bzw. 711 m)
 Egge Tunnel (2880 m)
 Ende Tunnel (944 m)
 Gemmenich Tunnel (870 m)
 Goldberg Tunnel (2200 m)
 Heinsberg Tunnel (1303 m)
 Hösel Tunnel (327 m)
 Ichenberg Tunnel (95 m)
 Lengerich Tunnel (581 m)
 Königsdorf Tunnel (1623 m)
 Kruin Tunnel: road and rail tunnels
 Reels Tunnel
 Rehberg Tunnel (1632 m)
 Rottbitze Tunnel (990 m)
 Rott Tunnel (351 m)
 Rudersdorf Tunnel (2651 m)
 Schee Tunnel (722 m)
 Schloss-Röttgen Tunnel (1047 m)
 Siesel Tunnel (95 m)
 Tunnel Troisdorf (627 m)
 Tunnels of the Cologne–Rhine/Main high speed railway: u. a. Siegauen Tunnel, Ittenbach Tunnel, Aegidienberg Tunnel
 Tunnel in the borough of Wuppertal

Rhineland-Palatinate

Road tunnels 

 B 260 Malberg Tunnel at Bad Ems, Length = 1600 m. Major part of the spa's bypass road. Longest road tunnel in Rhineland-Palatinate. Two-lane road tunnel, separate tubes. Cut-and-cover construction. Inaugurated 4  November 2006, Opened to traffic 5 November 2006.
 B 10 Stauf Tunnel at Sarnstall, Length = 1038 m
 A 62 Hörnchenberg Tunnel at Landstuhl, Length = 510 + 485 m
 B 10 Barbarossa Tunnel at Annweiler, Length = 616 m
 B 257 Ditschardt Tunnel at Altenahr, Length = 565 m
 K 101 Burgberg Tunnel at Bernkastel-Kues, Length = 560 m
 B 10 Fehrbach Tunnel at Pirmasens, length = 250+230 m
 L 103 Apollo Tunnel at Bad Bertrich, length = 441 m
 B 10 Löwenherz Tunnel at Annweiler, length = 405 m
 B 62 Siegkreisel Tunnel at Betzdorf, length = 378 m
 B 41 Altenberg Tunnel at Idar-Oberstein, length = 319 m
 B 10 Kostenfels Tunnel at Rinntal, length = 304m
 B 49 Glockenberg Tunnel at Koblenz, length = 294 m
 A 65 Queichheim Tunnel at Landau, length = 110+110 m
 B 257 Lingenberg Tunnel at Altenahr, length = 212 m
 L 103 Diana Tunnel at Bad Bertrich, length = 193 m
 B 407 Laurentius Tunnel at Saarburg, length = 185 m
 B 41 Hellberg Tunnel at Kirn (Nahe), length = 161 m
 B 257 Übigs Tunnel at Altenahr, length = 94 m
 B 260 Lindenbach Tunnel at Bad Ems, length = 93 m
 B 42 Lahneck Tunnel at Lahnstein, length = 86 m
 B 267 Engelslei Tunnel at Altenahr, length = 69 m
 L132 Altstadt Tunnel in Saarburg, length = 55 m

Railway tunnels 
 Kaiser Wilhelm Tunnel (4205 m, Koblenz–Trier railway)
 Wilseck Tunnel, 1268 m (Eifel Railway)
 East Rhine Railway: • Horchheim Tunnel (576 m) • Loreley Tunnel (368/417 m) • Roßstein Tunnel (378/457 m)
 Mainz railway tunnels: Three separate tunnels with a length of 655 m, 240 m and 1297 m, respectively
 Marienthal Tunnel (1050 m, Engers–Au railway)
 Palatine Ludwig Railway: • Wolfsberg Tunnel (320 m) • Lichtensteiner Kopf Tunnel (92 m) • Retschbach Tunnel (196 m) • Schönberg-Langeck Tunnel (366 m) • Mainzer Berg Tunnel (212 m) • Gipp Tunnel (217 m) • Köpfle Tunnel (158 m) • Eisenkehl Tunnel (65 m) • Kehre Tunnel (302 m) • Schloßberg Tunnel (208 m) • Franzosenwoog Tunnel (79 m) • Heiligenberg Tunnel (1347 m)
 Alsenz Valley Railway: • Altenhof Tunnel (436 m) • Kupferschmelz Tunnel (82 m) • Imsweil Tunnel (373 m) • Alsenz Tunnel (283 m)

Saarland

Road tunnels 

 Pellinger Berg Tunnel

Not yet upgraded in accordance with the RABT 2006 Guideline for Road Tunnel Equipment and Operation.

Railway tunnels 

 Mettlach Tunnel (1196 m)
 Merchweil Tunnel (624 m)
 Bildstock Tunnel (341 m)
 WiebelskircheTunnel (313 m)
 Bierfeld Tunnel (216 m)
 Schanzenberg Tunnel (248 m)
 Silvingen Tunnel (1715 m) abandoned
 Varus Tunnel (435 m) 'abandoned Wehrden Tunnel (104 m) partly abandoned

Saxony

Road tunnels 

 Königshainer Berge Tunnel (3300 m)
 Altfranken Tunnel (345 m)
 Dölzschen Tunnel
 Coschütz Tunnel
 Bramsch Tunnel in Dresden
 Central Station tunnel in Dresden
 Schottenberg tunnel in Meißen (719 m) – with a 5% gradient the steepest tunnel in Germany
 Bundesstraße 93 Tunnel in Zwickau (380 m)

Railway tunnels

Schleswig-Holstein

Road tunnels 

 Rendsburg Canal Tunnel
 Herrentunnel

Thuringia

Road tunnels 
 Rennsteig Tunnel

External links 
 Railway-tunnelportale.de/lb/inhalt/tunnelportale.html Photographs of most German tunnels 
 Railway-tunnel-info.de/ List of all German railway tunnels, sorted by name, length, etc.

 
Germany
Tunnels
Tunnels